Stanley Bleifeld (August 28, 1924 – March 26, 2011) was an American sculptor.

Early life
Born in Brooklyn, New York, Bleifeld earned bachelor of fine arts, bachelor of science in education and in 1949 a master of fine arts degree in painting at  Tyler School of Art of Temple University. After a trip to Rome in 1959 or 1960 he gave up painting for sculpture.

Career
Bleifeld received the following awards: Sculptor of the Year in Pietrasanta and the World, in 2004, the Henry Hering Memorial Medal of the National Sculpture Society, (he was president of the Society from 1991 to 1993), the Medal of Liberty from the American Civil Liberties Union, the Shikler Award from National Academy of Design, among others.

Bleifeld was a National Academician in Sculpture, and a member of the National Academy of Design, and helped set policy for that organization.

Bleifeld’s public monuments include sculptures for the United States Navy Memorial (he served in the Navy in World War II) in Washington, D.C., the Knights of Columbus Memorial in Connecticut, and baseball players at the Baseball Hall of Fame in Cooperstown, N.Y. The originals of his works The Lone Sailor and The Homecoming are two created for the Navy Memorial. Subsequently, a number of replicas deployed across the United States. On October 13, 2017, the occasion of the 242nd anniversary of the United States Navy, a replica of The Lone Sailor was dedicated in Pearl Harbor, Hawaii.

His work is in numerous private collections throughout the world.  In 2008, his monument to the Civil Rights Movement, It Seemed like Reaching for the Moon was dedicated at the statehouse in Richmond, Virginia.

Personal life and death
In 1949, Bleifeld married Naomi Ruby. The couple had two daughters, Becky and Emily. From 1950 until his death he lived and worked in Weston, CT, spending part of each year at a home and studio in Pietrasanta, Italy.

Bleifeld died from a cerebral hemorrhage following a fall at his Weston studio.

References

Further reading

External links 
 (artist's website)

1924 births
2011 deaths
Artists from Brooklyn
Temple University alumni
American male sculptors
20th-century American sculptors
20th-century American male artists